Norman Kitovitz (9 November 1920 – 1991)was a British former tennis player.

Kitovitz, who had origins in Singapore, attended Oxford University and was awarded his blues in 1939. He made his first main draw appearance at the Wimbledon Championships in 1947 and reached the singles second round on three occasions. In 1963 he won the singles title at the Surrey hard courts championships held in Roehampton.

Personal life
Kitovitz married Sheila Mary O'Leary in 1950. He is a grandfather of Paralympic gold medalist Paul Blake.

References

External links
 

1920 births
1991 deaths
British male tennis players
Alumni of the University of Oxford